This is a list of metro systems in that were built under the Soviet Union. There were 13 metro systems in 7 of the Soviet republics. A 14th metro system, the Dnipro Metro, started construction in 1982 but due to financial difficulties was not opened until 1995. Other than in Dnipro, only two metro systems built in post-Soviet states after the Union's dissolution are Kazan Metro in Russia (2005) and Almaty Metro in Kazakhstan (2011). Also the Volgograd Metrotram and Kryvyi Rih Metrotram are a two metrotram systems with elements of metro, opened in 1984 and 1986 respectively.

List

Notes

References

Russian railway-related lists

Soviet Union-related lists
Lists of buildings and structures in the Soviet Union